This article provides information on candidates who stood for the 1963 Australian federal election. The election was held on 30 November 1963.

By-elections, appointments and defections

By-elections and appointments
On 1 September 1962, Sam Benson (Labor) was elected to replace Alan Bird (Labor) as the member for Batman.
On 9 October 1962, George Whiteside (Labor) was appointed a Queensland Senator to replace Max Poulter (Labor).
On 1 June 1963, Jack Mortimer (Labor) was elected to replace Edgar Russell (Labor) as the member for Grey.
On 28 September 1963, Len Devine (Labor) was elected to replace Eddie Ward (Labor) as the member for East Sydney.

Retiring Members

Labor
 Norman Makin MP (Bonython, SA)
 Victor Kearney MP (Cunningham, NSW)
 Albert Thompson MP (Port Adelaide, SA)

Country
 Charles Davidson MP (Dawson, Qld)
 David Drummond MP (New England, NSW)
 Hugh Leslie MP (Moore, WA)

House of Representatives
Sitting members at the time of the election are shown in bold text. Successful candidates are highlighted in the relevant colour. Where there is possible confusion, an asterisk (*) is also used.

Australian Capital Territory

New South Wales

Northern Territory

Queensland

South Australia

Tasmania

Victoria

Western Australia

Senate
Sitting Senators are shown in bold text. Tickets that elected at least one Senator are highlighted in the relevant colour. Successful candidates are identified by an asterisk (*).

Queensland
A special election was held in Queensland to fill the vacancy caused by the death of Labor Senator Max Poulter. George Whiteside, also of the Labor Party, had been appointed to this vacancy in the interim period.

Summary by party 

Beside each party is the number of seats contested by that party in the House of Representatives for each state, as well as an indication of whether the party contested the special Senate election in Queensland.

See also
 1963 Australian federal election
 Members of the Australian House of Representatives, 1961–1963
 Members of the Australian House of Representatives, 1963–1966
 List of political parties in Australia

References
Adam Carr's Election Archive - House of Representatives 1963
Adam Carr's Election Archive - Senate 1963

1963 in Australia
Candidates for Australian federal elections